Tongareva may refer to:

Tongareva atoll
Tongareva language